Johann Georg Wyss known as Hansjörg Wyss (born 19 September 1935) is a Swiss billionaire businessman and donor to politically liberal and environmental causes in the United States. He is the founder and the former president and chairman of Synthes Holding AG, a medical device manufacturer. His Wyss Foundation has more than $2 billion in assets. As of March 2022, Wyss had a net worth of US$5.1 billion, according to Forbes. Having donated hundreds of millions of dollars to environmental causes, he has more recently increased his donations to groups promoting progressive causes. He is currently the co-owner of  football club Chelsea.

Early life and career
Wyss was born in Bern, Switzerland, in 1935. His father sold mechanical calculators and his mother was a homemaker. He was brought up in a flat with two sisters. After receiving a master's degree in civil and structural engineering from the Swiss Federal Institute of Technology Zurich in 1959, Wyss earned an MBA from Harvard Business School in 1965. Following that, he worked in various positions in the textile industry, including as a factory engineer and project manager for Chrysler in Pakistan, Turkey, and the Philippines.

Wyss also worked in the steel industry in Brussels, Belgium. During his time working in that industry, Wyss ran a side business selling aeroplanes. Through one sale, he met a surgeon who had co-founded Swiss medical device manufacturer Synthes. After that meeting, Wyss spent two years learning about the medical device industry. He then founded and became president of Synthes USA in 1977.

Synthes USA

In 1977, Wyss founded and became president of Synthes USA, the U.S. division of the Switzerland-based Synthes, a medical device manufacturer making internal screws and plates for broken bones. He founded the company after meeting Martin Allgoewer, the founder of AO Foundation, and obtaining permission to sell the organization's devices in the Americas. In an early initiative, Wyss opened a Synthes USA manufacturing plant in Colorado. Prior to that, another Swiss company manufactured Synthes' devices and exported them to the U.S. Under Wyss' control, the U.S. division expanded its sales team and trained surgeons how to use its products. Wyss served as Synthes' worldwide CEO and chairman until his resignation as CEO in 2007. He maintained his post as company chairman until Johnson & Johnson acquired Synthes in 2012. During his tenure, Wyss said discussions of new products made up one-third of board meetings. A manager assigned to the Norian project testified before a grand jury that "for somebody who is at his level and his level of success, I would say he [Wyss] has a surprising amount of contact with what's going on". Staff recalled meetings in which he intensively probed their projects.

In 2009, top executives at Synthes were indicted by U.S. Attorneys for Eastern Pennsylvania for using an untested calcium-phosphate-based bone cement on human patients without authorization from the Food and Drug Administration. Use of the bone cement resulted in the deaths of three people. Wyss was not indicted, but four top executives of Synthes were convicted and sentenced to prison terms.

In 2012, Wyss sold the company for $19.7 billion in cash and stock to Johnson & Johnson. According to Bloomberg, he received 97.4 million shares in Johnson & Johnson and $3.2 billion cash from the deal.

Philanthropy
According to Forbes, Wyss is "among the most philanthropic people in the world". Between 2004 and 2008, Businessweek estimated that Wyss personally donated nearly US$277 million. His giving increased subsequent to the sale of Synthes in 2012. In 2013, he signed The Giving Pledge, agreeing to give away the majority of his fortune. The assets of his charitable foundations equal nearly $2 billion.

He has made major donations to environmental and scientific causes, as well as progressive  organizations, including the Center for Budget and Policy Priorities, Health Leads, and the Constitutional Accountability Center.

In 2019, Wyss promised to donate 20 million swiss francs to the Bern Art Museum. He made it a condition that the Hodlerstrasse, on which the museum is located, be free of cars.

Environmentalism
As of 2015, Wyss and the Wyss Foundation had donated more than $350 million to environmental protection, including conservation of national forests and other public lands in the Western United States.

In October 2018, Wyss published an article in The New York Times stating that he was contributing $1 billion to environmental causes.

Wyss has said that he became passionate about the American West and land preservation after visiting the U.S. in 1958 as a student and taking a summer job as a surveyor with the Colorado Highway Department. 

In 1998, he created the Wyss Foundation. The objective of the foundation was to establish and sponsor informal partnerships between non-governmental organizations and the United States government, in order to place large swathes of land under permanent protection in the American West. The organization sponsors the Wyss Scholars Program for graduate-level education in conservation.

The landscape protection strategies of the foundation have included assisting the purchase of mineral leases from oil and gas companies. Other causes the Wyss Foundation supports include river restorations, ocean conservation in Peru and Canada, anti-poaching efforts in Africa, and environmental journalism. In 2017, the organization announced a charitable commitment of $65 million to African Parks, a conservation nonprofit overseeing ten parks in seven African nations, to help create new protected areas in Africa.

In 2010, Wyss gave The Nature Conservancy $35 million to purchase 310,000 acres in Montana as part of one of the largest private conservation purchases in the United States. In 2013, he donated $4.25 million to The Trust for Public Land for the purchase of oil and gas leases in Wyoming to prevent development in the Hoback Basin. In 2016, Wyss made another donation to the Trust for Public Land that resulted in the expansion of Saguaro National Park in Arizona by 300 acres, including a mile and a half of Rincon Creek.

Wyss is involved with The Wilderness Society and Rails-to-Trails. He serves on the boards of the Southern Utah Wilderness Alliance, the Center for American Progress, and the Grand Canyon Trust. Wyss has donated more than $6 million to the Center for American Progress. In 2011, Wyss won the Robert Marshall Award from The Wilderness Society for his conservation work.

In January 2015, the conservative U.S. news site, The Daily Caller, accused John Podesta, who was at the time an advisor on environmental issues to the Obama administration, of an alleged ethics violation for pushing the advocacy agenda of a former employer, because previously, he had received $87,000 as a consulting fee for work he did in 2013 for the HJW Foundation (a Wyss organization that later was merged with the Wyss Foundation). According to the High Country News, "nothing ever came of the accusations".

In 2018, Wyss donated $1 billion to the Wyss Campaign for Nature, aiming to conserve 30% of the world's land and oceans by 2030.

Scientific research
In 2007, he received the Harvard Business School Alumni Achievement Award, and in the fall of 2008, it was announced that Wyss donated the largest single endowment from one source in the history of Harvard, when he gave $125 million to found a multidisciplinary institute, the Wyss Institute for Biologically Inspired Engineering at Harvard University.

In 2012–13, he announced the creation of the Campus Biotech and of its Wyss Center for Bio- and Neuro-engineering in Geneva, Switzerland. In 2014, Wyss donated $120 million to the Swiss Federal Institute of Technology Zurich and the University of Zurich for the Wyss Translational Center Zurich.

In 2019, Wyss donated a further $131 million to Harvard Business School to support the Wyss Institute.

Political activities
In 2015, Wyss publicly declared that he was in favor of higher inheritance taxes for the wealthy in Switzerland.

Wyss is a member of the Democracy Alliance, a club of liberal donors.

There has been a longstanding rivalry between billionaire Wyss, who supports liberal politics, and billionaire Christoph Blocher, who supports conservative politics. Both entered into public debates about the bilateral agreements between Switzerland and the European Union as well as the limitation of immigration into Switzerland. Wyss highlighted the advantages of openness toward the EU and immigrants while Blocher advocated for Switzerland's independence in those matters.

The Hub Project
In 2021, The New York Times reported that Wyss had "quietly created a sophisticated political operation to advance progressive policy initiatives and the Democrats who support them". In 2015, the Wyss Foundation initiated The Hub Project, which seeks "to shape media coverage to help Democratic causes". The goal of The Hub Project is to help Democrats be more effective at conveying their arguments through the news media and directly to voters. It seeks to "dramatically shift the public debate and policy positions of core decision makers". The Hub Project engaged in paid advertising campaigns in 2018 that criticized Republican congressional candidates.

The Hub Project is part of Arabella Advisors, a leading vehicle for funneling "dark money" on the political center-left. The Hub Project is housed within the Arabella-sponsored groups the New Venture Fund and the Sixteen Thirty Fund. Between 2007 and 2020, the Wyss Foundation donated approximately $56.5 million to these groups. The New Venture Fund underwrites Acronym, which owns the Courier Newsroom, a group seeking to boost Democratic candidates through local news stories and advertising.

The Wyss Foundation has donated to States Newsroom, a nonprofit media group. Media watchdog NewsGuard said State Newsroom's journalism had been "bought by people with a political agenda". 

In 2021, along with  Stewart W. Bainum Jr., Wyss made a bid to buy Tribune Publishing, which publishes newspapers including The Chicago Tribune and The Baltimore Sun. The New York Times reported that "the big-money activism of Mr. Wyss and Mr. Bainum highlights concerns that wealthy owners may try to influence news coverage to advance their political agendas", and on April 14, 2021, they identified him as the top bidder. On April 17, 2021, Wyss backed out of the potential deal while Bainum Jr. continued to seek alternate investors in his bid to buy Tribune Publishing.

Personal life
In 2014, Wyss said he carried only a Swiss passport and did not have a U.S. green card. As of 2021, The New York Times wrote, he "has not disclosed publicly whether he holds citizenship or permanent residency" in the U.S.

Wyss lives in Wyoming. His daughter, Amy, is a resident of Wyoming also. Wyss is a hiker, skier, and backpacker. He also is a hobby pilot. He is involved in outdoor education programs and he funds local efforts to conserve wildlife habitat and public lands in the Rocky Mountains.

In 2000, Wyss purchased the  Halter Ranch and Vineyard in western Paso Robles, California. The ranch includes an 1,800-acre wildlife reserve and a 281-acre vineyard producing 13 varietals of grapes using methods that are "Sustainability in Practice" certified. The ranch hosts tours and was named "Best Vineyard Experience" by Sunset Magazine in 2015.

As of 2017, Wyss ranked 281 on the Forbes list of billionaires, with an estimated net worth of approximately $5.5 billion. He ranks number 235 on the Bloomberg list of billionaires.

On May 6, 2022 Chelsea F.C. announced that the club agreed to terms with a new ownership group, of which Wyss is a member.

References

External links
The Wyss Foundation
Wyss Institute for Biologically Inspired Engineering
Wyss Campaign for Nature

ETH Zurich alumni
Giving Pledgers
21st-century philanthropists
Harvard Business School alumni
Living people
People from Bern
Swiss billionaires
Swiss businesspeople
Swiss philanthropists
Swiss emigrants to the United States
1935 births
People from Wilson, Wyoming
Chelsea F.C. chairmen and investors